Petrophila daemonalis is a moth in the family Crambidae. It was described by Harrison Gray Dyar Jr. in 1907. It has been recorded in the US state of Texas.

References

Petrophila
Moths described in 1907